Phillips v. Payne, 92 U.S. 105 (1875), was a United States Supreme Court case that ruled that since 1847, pursuant to the act of Congress of the preceding year, the State of Virginia has been in de facto possession of the County of Alexandria, which, prior thereto, formed a part of the District of Columbia.

The political department of its government has, since then, uniformly asserted and the head of its judicial department expressly affirmed its title. Congress has, by more than one act, recognized the transfer as a settled fact.

A resident of the county in a suit to recover the amount by him paid under protest for taxes upon his property there situate is therefore estopped from raising the question as to the validity of the retrocession.

See also
 District of Columbia retrocession
 List of United States Supreme Court cases, volume 92

References

External links
 
1875 in United States case law
United States Supreme Court cases
United States Supreme Court cases of the Waite Court